Lee McRae (born January 23, 1966) is a retired track and field athlete from the United States who won the gold medal in the men's 100 metres at the 1987 Pan American Games.  Lee won three consecutive NCAA indoor national championships (1986–1988) in the 55 meters and the 1986 NCAA Outdoor National Championship in the 100 meters while at the University of Pittsburgh. As a sophomore at Pitt in 1986, he broke Carl Lewis's 55 meter indoor world record by finishing in 6.00 seconds.

A native of Pembroke, North Carolina, McRae attended West Robeson High School.

He was a very fast starter; this ability enabled him to win major titles indoors and as a first leg runner in the U.S 4 × 100 m relay team.

Personal bests
 60 yd — 5.99
 55 m — 6.00 (Former World Record)
 60 m — 6.50 (Former World Record)
 100 m — 10.07 (Universiade record)
 200 m — 20.50/20.44w

References

 Profile
 The International Track and Field Annual 1987/8

1966 births
Living people
People from Pembroke, North Carolina
American male sprinters
Pittsburgh Panthers men's track and field athletes
Athletes (track and field) at the 1987 Pan American Games
World Athletics Championships medalists
World Athletics Indoor Championships winners
Pan American Games gold medalists for the United States
Pan American Games medalists in athletics (track and field)
Universiade medalists in athletics (track and field)
Goodwill Games medalists in athletics
Universiade gold medalists for the United States
USA Indoor Track and Field Championships winners
World Athletics Championships winners
Medalists at the 1987 Summer Universiade
Competitors at the 1986 Goodwill Games
Medalists at the 1987 Pan American Games